Zolochiv is an urban-type settlement in Bohodukhiv Raion, Kharkiv Oblast, Ukraine. It hosts the administration of Zolochiv settlement hromada, one of the hromadas of Ukraine. Population:

History 
This settlement was founded in 1677.

It was a town in Kharkov uyezd of Kharkov Governorate of the Russian Empire.

A local newspaper is published here since 1931.

During World War II it was under German occupation from October 1941 to August 1943.

In January 1989 the population was 12,878 people.

In January 2013 the population was 9,012 people.

Until 18 July 2020, Zolochiv was the administrative center of Zolochiv Raion. The raion was abolished in July 2020 as part of the administrative reform of Ukraine, which reduced the number of raions of Kharkiv Oblast to seven. The area of Zolochiv Raion was merged into Bohodukhiv Raion.

Transportation

А railway station is on the Southern railway.

Notable people 
 
Sarah Ashton-Cirillo (born 1977), official representative in negotiations with aid groups
Oleksandr Lebedynets (born 1984), professional footballer
Igor Vovchanchyn (born 1973), mixed martial artist and kickboxer

References

Urban-type settlements in Bohodukhiv Raion
Kharkovsky Uyezd
Bohodukhiv Raion